Lovachol (also Romanized as Lovāchol; also known as Lovāchol-e Mashāyekh and Loveh Chāl) is a village in Khotbeh Sara Rural District, Kargan Rud District, Talesh County, Gilan Province, Iran. At the 2006 census, its population was 339, in 90 families.

References 

Populated places in Talesh County